The C. K. Choi Building is a building known for its sustainable design features. It is the University of British Columbia's "flagship environmental building" in what it calls its 'living laboratory', the campus used to showcase "innovative approaches to conserving energy, water and materials, while striving to make positive impacts on the environment." Located in the northwest quadrant of the UBC campus, the building is named after Dr. Cheung-Kok Choi, a businessman and philanthropist in China, Hong Kong and Canada, and a major donor to UBC.
The C.K. Choi Building was purpose-built as a university office building to house UBC's Institute of Asian Research's five research centres.  These focus on China, Japan, Korea, Southeast Asia, and India and South Asia.  The "daringly innovative architecture" integrates cultural expression, interior and exterior architectural presence, together with environmental features and functions.  The five identical curved roof forms reflect the institute's Asian focus, providing an identifiable focus for each research centre without giving predominance to one culture or centre over another, and provide natural light and natural ventilation to interior spaces.

Institute of Asian Research

The Institute of Asian Research at the University of British Columbia is a research institute founded in 1978 that has been the foremost research centre in Canada for the study of Asia. With a broad geographic reach extending to China, India and South Asia, Japan, Korea and Southeast Asia, the institute conducts research and teaching in policy-relevant issues informed by language and area studies. The institute has played a central role in building UBC's excellence in research, teaching and community liaison in matters pertaining to Asia. The institute has pursued research into many aspects of the human experience in Asia.

Design Team

 Architects + Sustainability: Matsuzaki Wright
Landscape Architects: Cornelia Hahn Oberlander
Structural Engineers: Read Jones Christoffersen
Mechanical Engineers: Keen Engineering Co. Ltd. (now Stantec)
Electrical Engineers: Robert Freundlich & Associates Ltd.

Owner:University of British Columbia, Freda Pagani, Campus Planning and Development
Owner's Sustainability Advisor:  Bob Berkebile, BNIM

Sustainable Features

From the project's start, it was intended to be "an embodiment of new standards for sustainable design, construction and operations."
The building was designed with ambitious targets for minimizing energy usage but an evaluation conducted on the building's first ten years found that the performance exceeded expectations by a significant amount.  The building was completed before the US and Canadian Green Building Councils' LEED Rating Systems were developed, but the building's performance compares favourably with those more recent standards.

* Site:  Impact on site development was minimized by building on an existing parking lot without disturbing the large existing trees, which also provide afternoon shading, reduced heat gain, and cooling requirement.

* Building Form:  The narrow form of the three-storey building was derived from an early decision to minimize the site impact and to provide natural light and ventilation to each occupied space.

* Recycled Content:  Approximately 50% of materials in the building are recycled or re-used, including brick cladding from early 20th century street pavers (brick "cobblestones"), approximately 65% of the heavy timber structural frame was salvaged from the Armories Building across the street, interior steel railings at stairs and balconies, sinks, toilet accessories, doors and frames, approximately 25% of the electrical conduit, as well as other components that used recycled materials in their fabrication.
 
* Sanitary System:  When initially constructed, the building was not connected to the campus sanitary (sewage) system.  Instead the building washrooms were fitted with composting toilets that allowed waste to fall down through a stainless steel chutes into composting bins located in the basement of the building.  Urine filtering through the compost medium forms a leachate, which initially was drained and combined with drainage from the lavatories and released into a linear bioswale or "greywater trench", designed by the landscape architect and the mechanical engineer.  The concept was to enable the plants in the greywater trench to benefit from the nutrients contained in the leachate, and eventually allow the finished compost to be used within the landscaped areas surrounding the building.  However, samples collected of the leachate and finished compost in 2011 revealed these materials did not meet the provincial regulatory environmental and health & safety standards.  Consequently, the leachate is now being drained to sewer and the compost product is being disposed of to a sanitary landfill.  The university is currently considering options to either replace the composting system with a conventional plumbing and toilet system, or another alternate system such as a water reclamation and recycle process.

* Stormwater System:  Stormwater is collected in an underground vault for landscape irrigation.

* Energy Consumption:
Some of the key energy savings features include: retaining the large trees along the western edge of the building to reduce cooling loads; building forms to enhance internal stack effects to provide air change through natural ventilation and only localized fans; building forms that enhance daylighting to reduce electric lighting and cooling loads; daylight sensors and occupancy sensors to minimize unnecessary use of lights; high efficiency luminaries with lower ambient lighting levels and task lights where appropriate; higher than mandated insulation for walls, roof, and glazing; careful attention to detailing and construction methodology to minimize heat loss through thermal breaks; utilizing waste heat from existing adjacent steam vault.

* Finishes:  The levels of interior finishes were reduced to minimum:  exposed, polished concrete floor slabs with no carpet or linoleum; exposed roof/floor deck with no suspended ceilings; exposed or galvanized steel and metal without paint wherever technically possible.

* Indoor Air Quality:  Air pollutants were reduced through the sequencing of construction and material selection, such as eliminating carpet adhesives, using formaldehyde-free millwork, solvent-free finishes, and natural materials such as wool carpet. Copy machines have direct exhaust venting.

* Ventilation:  There is no mechanical ventilation for the rooms in the building.  However, ventilation is provided for the washrooms, service rooms, copy machines areas, and for the composting system to prevent foul odours in the building and to maintain aerobic conditions at the surface of the compost.  All room ventilation is by way of vents integrated into the window frames to provide fresh air, which is supplemented for cooling by opening windows.  The five raised roof forms have vent louvers at the top to provide convection to draw air in through the vents below.  There is no air conditioning system.

* Heat:  Heat exchangers located in nearby underground steam tunnels extract surplus heat that would otherwise radiate into the ground for use in the building.

* Electricity:  No new primary service from the electrical/hydro grid was provided.  Service to the building is from surplus capacity in the adjacent Asian Centre.

* Cost:  $4.5 million for 32,000 sq. ft., or CAD$140 per sq. ft. (1996 dollars), for "a model of environmental sustainability".

Performance
At the start of the design a primary goal was for the project to "set new standards for sustainable design, construction and operation."  
The following items compare performance against a baseline prototype.
(All information is this section, unless noted otherwise, is extracted from the 1999 post-occupancy evaluation Process Makes Perfect)

Savings are therefore over 45%.

Energy (for heating):   Consumption is 69% more than the ASHRAE 90.1 prototype building during peak heating months.  This compares to an expected 79% more due to large exterior wall area/floor area, a function of the building/site configuration and large amount of glass to facilitate natural lighting.  This in turn was expected to be offset by savings in electricity (for lighting).

Energy (electricity):  Monthly Peak demand is 75% less than the ASHRAE 90.1 prototype building (24 kW versus 97 kW).

The prototype used, per UBC policy, was not typical as it did not include air conditioning, so the prototype modeled had a lower energy consumption benchmark than would normally be expected for this type of office building, thus the savings compared to a standard office building would be greater than the 23% savings shown.

On-Site Recycling:   The contract documents required an on-site materials separation and recycling program, including documentation requirements for hauling and disposal, and preparation of a waste management plan to be prepared by the contractor prior to the start of work.  Despite initial resistance from the contractor, hauling costs were reduced and separating and stocking wood ends provided an alternate source of wood for small framing, and the contractor reported that less wood was required than had been originally anticipated, resulting in a savings to the contractor who then became a supporter of site separation. The local government responsible for handling waste (the Greater Vancouver Regional District (GVRD)) analyzed the waste diversion data from the site and found that approximately 95% of construction waste was diverted from the landfill.

Recycled Materials:  The project goal was to use 50% reused and recycled materials for all components of the building, a target the post-occupancy evaluation team determined had been exceeded.

Composting System:  As noted above, samples collected of the finished compost product and leachate from the compost revealed that neither met the required provincial environmental and health & safety regulatory standards, and considerations are being made to remove the composting toilet system and replace it with an alternate system.

Awards
Pre-dated establishment of LEED by 4 years.
 1996 BC Hydro Energy Smart Award
 1996	British Columbia Earth Award, Building Owners and Managers Association
 1997 Building Award of Excellence, Consulting Engineers of British Columbia
 1998 List of Canadian awards, Architectural Institute of British Columbia
 1998 Award for Innovation Excellence, Architectural Institute of British Columbia (Matsuzaki Wright Architects Inc.)
 2000 Earth Day 2000 Top Ten Award, American Institute of Architects Committee on the Environment

References

Bibliography and External links
 IAR official website 
 Gudrun, Will.  A Constructive Idea, Vancouver Courier, pp. 1,4-5. Vol. 87, No.48, 16 June 1996
 Alive.com - UBC Uses Eco-Sense
 BuildingGreen.com
 Cascadia Building Council
 Cole, Raymond J.  Green Buildings: In Transit to a Sustainable World, Canadian Architect, July 1996, Volume 41, No. 7, pp. 12–13. Retrieved online October 2010.
 Cole, Ray, and Steiger, Michelle, Environmental Research Group, School of Architecture University of British Columbia:  GREEN BUILDINGS - GREY OCCUPANTS?.   Web-Proceedings: American Institute of Architects/US Green Building Council – Mainstreaming Green Conference, Chattanooga, TN, 14-19 October 1999
 Cornelia Oberlander - landscape and building features
 Commission for Environmental Cooperation
 Cascadia Building Council
 Environmental News Network, 9 September 2008
 GreenStudentU - British Columbia's Sewage-Free Building
 IAR - A Constructive Idea
 Marques, Jorge, and Pagani, Freda, and Perdue, Joanne.  Process Makes Product:  The C.K. Choi Building For The Institute of Asian Research at the University of British Columbia (post occupancy evaluation through December 1998)  Retrieved online October 2010.
 Metaefficient.com
 MetroVancouver.org Green Value case studies
 Old to New - Design Guide: Salvaged Building Materials in New Construction, 3rd Edition, 2002
 Prince, Richard E., UBC Department of Fine Arts. Script for an Asian Landscape, p. 18. Design for a New Millenium, ed. E. Laquian (1996). Institute of Asian Research, Vancouver. Retrieved online October 2010.
 Seeing With New Eyes
 SustainableBuilding.com
 Sustainability TV - A Tour of the C.K. Choi Building
 Treehugger.com:  Vancouver Building Goes Off-Pipe
 University of Waterloo - case study

University of British Columbia
Sustainable buildings in Canada
Buildings and structures in Vancouver